Hüseyin Hüsnü Emir Erkilet (1883; Constantinople (Istanbul) - 1954; Ankara) was an officer of the Ottoman Army and a general of the Turkish Army.

In the fall 1941 he, along with General Ali Fuad Erden, visited the occupied territories in Ukraine (including Crimea) on invitation of Gerd von Rundstedt. From there he and other Turkish officers flew to Rastenburg to meet Hitler in person. In 1943 he published his essays on that trip under title "What I Saw on the Eastern Front."

Being a staunch Turanist, he was briefly detained for Panturkic activities in 1948 together with some other prominent Turanists.

Works
Yıldırım, İstanbul, 1921.
Büyük Harpte Tank Muharebesi
Seferî Karargâhlarda Kurmay Görevleri, İstanbul, 1921.
Erkan-ı Harbiyye Meslek, Vezaif ve Teşkilatı, Tarihi ve İlmî Tetkikat, İstanbul, 1924.
Dağda Harp Hareketleri hakkında bir Tetkik, İstanbul 1926. (Maurice Abadie)
H. H. Emir Erkilet Paşa.'nın Avrupa'da tetkik seyahatlerine ait rapora zeyl, Ankara, 1927.
Harp Albümü, İstanbul Cumhuriyet Basımevi.
Şark Cephesinde Gördüklerim, Hilmi Kitabevi, İstanbul, 1943.
2. Cihan Harbi ve Türkiye, Giriş: Harbin Avrupa'da Doğurduğu Pürüzlü Meseleler, İnkılâp Kitabevi, İstanbul, 1945.

See also
List of high-ranking commanders of the Turkish War of Independence

Sources

External links

, Kocasinan Erkilet General Emir İlköğretim Okulu. 

1883 births
1958 deaths
Turkish people of Circassian descent
Military personnel from Istanbul
Ottoman Military Academy alumni
Ottoman Military College alumni
Ottoman Army officers
Turkish Sunni Muslims
Ottoman military personnel of the Balkan Wars
Ottoman military personnel of World War I
Turkish collaborators with Nazi Germany
Turkish military personnel of the Greco-Turkish War (1919–1922)
Recipients of the Medal of Independence with Red Ribbon (Turkey)
Turkish Army generals
General Commanders of the Gendarmerie of Turkey
Writers from Istanbul